Stray Bullets is a 2016 American thriller film written, directed, edited, and composed by Jack Fessenden.  Fessenden also produced it with his parents, Larry Fessenden and Beck Underwood.  The film stars Jack Fessenden and Asa Spurlock as two teenagers who encounter, and are kidnapped by, mobsters played by James LeGros, Larry Fessenden, and John Speredakos.  It premiered at the Oldenburg International Film Festival on September 16, 2016, and was released in the US on February 10, 2017.

Premise 
Two bored teenagers are taken hostage by mobsters fleeing a botched job and a hitman.

Cast 
 Asa Spurlock as Ash
 Jack Fessenden as Connor
 James LeGros as Cody
 John Speredakos as Dutch
 Larry Fessenden as Charlie
 Robert Burke Warren as J. T.
 Erik Kraus as Paul
 Roger Peltzman as Kauffman
 Kevin Corrigan as Nick
 Cally Mansfield as Emma
 Fenner Micheline as Sam
 Steve Heller as Richie

Production 
Shooting began when Jack Fessenden was 15 years old and completed when he was 16, taking 16 days.

Release 
Stray Bullets premiered at the Oldenburg International Film Festival on September 16, 2016.  Screen Media Films gave it a limited release and via video on demand on February 10, 2017.

Reception 
Rotten Tomatoes, a review aggregator, reports that 75% of eight surveyed critics gave the film a positive review; the average rating is 6.2/10.  Metacritic rated it 55/100 based on five reviews.  Dennis Harvey of Variety wrote that it "feels a couple story beats short of a satisfying whole, [but] it's admirably well-crafted within its mostly savvy limitations".  Harvey criticized the film for not being fleshed out enough beyond its beginnings as a short film but said this  "feels like more of a minor letdown than a major failing" due to the technical proficiency, praising Jack Fessenden's potential as a director.  Neil Young of The Hollywood Reporter called it "a strikingly impressive calling-card", though he said Jack Fessenden's acting is weaker than his directing and musicianship.  Writing in The New York Times, Ken Jaworowski said that the film feels padded to feature length and has a cheesy ending.  He concluded that Fessenden has "more than a little raw skill" and should be encouraged despite the film's shortcomings.  Noel Murray of the Los Angeles Times wrote, "there's a confidence and energy to Stray Bullets that compensates for the rather rudimentary, over-familiar story".

References

External links 
 
 

2016 films
2016 crime thriller films
2016 independent films
2010s English-language films
American independent films
American crime thriller films
2010s American films